Monophadnus is a genus of sawflies belonging to the family Tenthredinidae.

Species:
 Monophadnus alpicola
 Monophadnus latus
 Monophadnus monticola
 Monophadnus pallescens
 Monophadnus spinolae

References

Tenthredinidae
Sawfly genera